Lindsay Wood is a Scottish curler.

Awards
 Frances Brodie Award: 2007
  All-Star Team, Women: 2002

Teams

Women's

Mixed

References

External links
 
 Some Famous Woods - Clan Wood Society

Living people
Scottish female curlers
Scottish curling champions
Continental Cup of Curling participants
Year of birth missing (living people)